Richard Newland may refer to:
 Richard Newland (cricketer) (1713–1778), English cricketer
 Richard Newland (racehorse trainer), British horse trainer
 Richard Francis Newland (died 1873), banker and politician in the colony of South Australia